West Hingham is an MBTA Commuter Rail station in Hingham, Massachusetts. It serves the Greenbush Line. It consists of a single side platform serving the line's one track. The station is fully accessible.

History

The New Haven Railroad abandoned its remaining Old Colony Division lines on June 30, 1959, after the completion of the Southeast Expressway. The West Hingham station had been located north of the South Street level crossing.

The MBTA reopened the Greenbush Line on October 31, 2007, with West Hingham station located south of South Street where room for a parking lot was available. A downtown Hingham station was not possible due to the narrow tunnel constructed to avoid level crossings in Hingham Square, so West Hingham and Nantasket Junction stations both serve Hingham.

Solar panels were installed over the parking lot in 2018 – one of the first three of a planned 37 such installations at MBTA parking lots – though activation was delayed by a dispute between the MBTA and the utility over liability.

References

External links

MBTA - West Hingham
Station from Google Maps Street View

MBTA Commuter Rail stations in Plymouth County, Massachusetts
Stations along Old Colony Railroad lines
Railway stations in the United States opened in 2007
Buildings and structures in Hingham, Massachusetts
2007 establishments in Massachusetts